{{DISPLAYTITLE:C20H20O7}}
The molecular formula C20H20O7 (molar mass: 372.36 g/mol, exact mass: 372.120903 u) may refer to: 

 Sinensetin, a methylated flavone
 Tangeritin, a methylated flavone

Molecular formulas